Rimrock Lake is a lake in the Cariboo Regional District of British Columbia, about  north of the city of Williams Lake. It lies at  elevation immediately adjacent to Cuisson Lake.

References

Lakes of the Cariboo